The women's team pursuit in the 2013–14 ISU Speed Skating World Cup was contested over four races on four occasions, out of a total of six World Cup occasions for the season, with the first occasion taking place in Calgary, Alberta, Canada, on 8–10 November 2013, and the last occasion taking place in Heerenveen, Netherlands, on 14–16 March 2014. The races were over six laps.

The Dutch team went undefeated through the season, and won the cup with the maximum points possible, 450, and a margin of 135 points to the next team. Behind Netherlands, the Polish team took the silver, while Japan edged out Canada for the bronze, with a 5 points margin.

Top three

Race medallists

Standings 
Standings as of 16 March 2014 (end of the season).

References 

 
Women team pursuit
ISU